The New Jersey Titans are a Tier II junior ice hockey team in the North American Hockey League. Based in Middletown Township, New Jersey, the Titans play their home games at the Middletown Ice World.

History 
Prior to the franchise's move to Middletown, the NAHL franchise played from 2005 to 2012 in Traverse City, Michigan as the Traverse City North Stars, and from 2012 to 2015 in Sault Ste. Marie, Michigan, as the Soo Eagles. Prior to purchasing the NAHL franchise, the Titans' junior hockey organization had previously fielded a Tier III junior hockey team in the Eastern Hockey League from 2012 to 2015. They also had a team in the Tier III (formerly Tier III Junior B) Metropolitan Junior Hockey League until 2016. The organization re-added a Tier III team in 2020, when it bought the New England Stars franchise in the North American 3 Hockey League (NA3HL).

The team originated in Espanola, Ontario, and was originally called the Espanola Eagles.

The Titans won their first title in franchise history, winning the 2021–22 NAHL Robertson Cup National Championship.

Season-by-season records

References

External links
 NAHL Titans website
 EHL/MJHL New Jersey Titans official website
 North American Hockey League webpage

Amateur ice hockey teams in New Jersey
Ice hockey teams in New Jersey
Middletown Township, New Jersey
Ice hockey clubs established in 2015
2015 establishments in New Jersey